William of Sainte-Mère-Église was a medieval Bishop of London.

Life
William's family originated from Sainte-Mère-Église, in the Cotentin Peninsula, Normandy, and he held the prebend of 'Ealdstreet' in the diocese of London as well as being dean of St Martin le Grand in London.  He also held a prebend in the diocese of York.

In 1193, William, along with the bishop of Salisbury Hubert Walter, found King Richard I of England where he was being held captive at Ochsenfurt in Germany.  He was also named the clerk of the exchequer who was responsible for overseeing the Jewish moneylenders, and worked in Walter's new system of supervision to reduce fraud.

William was elected to the See of London on 16 September 1198 and consecrated on 23 May 1199.  He resigned the see on 25 January 1221 and retired to the Augustinian priory of St Osyth's.  He died on 27 March 1224.

Notes

Citations

References

 
 
 
 
 

Bishops of London
1224 deaths
Anglo-Normans
Deans of St Paul's
12th-century English Roman Catholic bishops
13th-century English Roman Catholic bishops
Year of birth unknown